AK Crvena zvezda is an athletics club from Belgrade, Serbia. It is part of the sports society SD Crvena Zvezda.

Honours and achievements

Men
National Championships
Winners (40): 1953, 1954, 1955, 1967, 1968, 1969, 1970, 1971, 1972, 1973, 1974, 1975, 1976, 1977, 1978, 1979, 1980, 1981, 1982, 1983, 1985, 1986, 1987, 1988, 1989, 1990, 1992, 1993, 1994, 1995, 2002, 2008, 2009, 2010, 2011, 2017, 2018, 2019, 2020, 2021

Cross country running
Winners (19): 1948, 1953, 1954, 1959, 1960, 1971, 1972, 1973, 1977, 1979, 1980, 1985, 1986, 1992, 1993, 1994, 2006, 2020, 2022

National Cups
Winners (43): 1966, 1967, 1968, 1969, 1970, 1971, 1972, 1973, 1974, 1975, 1976, 1977, 1978, 1979, 1980, 1981, 1982, 1983, 1984, 1985, 1986, 1987, 1988, 1989, 1990, 1992, 1993, 1994, 1995, 2002, 2003, 2004, 2005, 2006, 2007, 2008, 2009, 2010, 2011, 2012, 2015, 2016, 2019

European Champion Clubs Cup
Winners (1): 1989
Runners-up (1): 1981
Third place (1): 1976

Women
National Championships
Winners (23): 1986, 1987, 1988, 1989, 1992, 1993, 1994, 1995, 2002, 2007, 2008, 2009, 2010, 2011, 2012, 2013, 2014, 2015, 2017, 2018, 2019, 2020, 2021

Cross country running
Winners (6): 1982, 1993, 2002, 2017, 2018, 2019

National Cups
Winners (21): 1986, 1987, 1988, 1989, 1992, 1993, 1994, 2002, 2003, 2004, 2005, 2006, 2008, 2009, 2010, 2011, 2013, 2014, 2015, 2016, 2019

European Champion Clubs Cup
Runners-up (1): 1989
Third place (1): 1988

Notable athletes

  Fikre Wondafrash
  Slobodan Branković
  Branko Dangubić
  Borislav Dević
  Zoran Đurđević
  Janoš Hegediš
  Velimir Ilić
  Ivan Ivančić
  Dejan Jovković
  Cmiljka Kalušević
  Branislav Karaulić
  Dane Korica
  Jovan Lazarević
  Leon Lukman
  Ismail Mačev
  Andreja Marinković
  Julija Matej
  Milan Milakov
  Vladimir Milić
  Veliša Mugoša
  Dragan Mustapić
  Breda Pergar
  Milan Petaković
  Milad Petrušić
  Borisav Pisić
  Slobodan Popović
  Marija Radosavljević
  Rade Radovanović
  Milovan Savić
  Nenad Stekić
  Kornelija Šinković
  Miodrag Todosijević
  Dragutin Topić
  Petar Vukićević
  Branko Zorko
  Marian Kolasa
  Mirosław Żerkowski
  Nenad Lončar
  Dragan Perić
  Sonja Stolić
  Tatjana Jelača
  Strahinja Jovančević
  Armin Sinančević

External links
 Athletic Federation of Serbia
 Шампиони Европе

Sport in Belgrade
Athletics clubs in Serbia
1945 establishments in Serbia
Crvena zvezda